Kingdom of the Spiders is a 1977 American science fiction horror film directed by John "Bud" Cardos and produced by Igo Kantor and Jeffrey M. Sneller. The screenplay is credited to Richard Robinson and Alan Caillou, from an original story by Sneller and Stephen Lodge. The film was released by Dimension Pictures (not to be confused with the distributor Dimension Films). It stars William Shatner, Tiffany Bolling, Woody Strode, Lieux Dressler, and Altovise Davis.

The film is one of the better-remembered entries in the "nature on the rampage" subgenre of science fiction/horror films in the 1970s, due in part to its memorable scenes of people and animals being attacked by tarantulas, its availability on home video and airing on cable television, particularly on the USA Network, but primarily because of Shatner's starring role.

Plot
Dr. Robert "Rack" Hansen, a veterinarian in rural Verde Valley, Arizona, receives an urgent call from local farmer Walter Colby. Colby is upset because his prize calf is sick for no apparent reason. Hansen examines the calf, which dies shortly afterward. Hansen cannot explain what made the animal go ill so quickly, but sends samples of the calf's blood to a university lab in Flagstaff.

Diane Ashley, an arachnologist, arrives to tell Hansen that the calf was killed by a massive dose of spider venom, which Hansen greets with skepticism. Undaunted, Ashley tells him that she wishes to examine the carcass and the area where it became sick. Hansen escorts Ashley to Colby's farm. Moments after they arrive, Colby's wife, Birch, discovers their dog is dead; Ashley discovers that it also died from a massive injection of spider venom. Hansen is incredulous, until Colby states that he recently found a massive "spider hill" on a back section of his farmland. He takes Hansen and Ashley to the hill, which is covered with tarantulas. Ashley theorizes that the tarantulas are converging due to the heavy use of pesticides, which are eradicating their natural food supply. In order to survive, the spiders, normally cannibalistic of each other, are combining to attack and eat larger animals.

Hansen and Ashley return to the Colby farm to burn the spider hill. As the scientists and the Colbys walk past a barn, a bull, attacked by tarantulas, stampedes out. Colby douses the spider hill with gasoline and lights it on fire, but many of the spiders escape using a distant tunnel. Colby is attacked by a group of tarantulas while driving his truck the next day, sending the truck over the side of a hill and killing him. Hansen happens upon the accident scene and he and sheriff Gene Smith find Colby's body encased in spider webs. Ashley is notified by her colleagues that a sample of venom from one of the spiders is five times more toxic than normal. Hansen is told by the sheriff that several more spider hills have been located on Colby's property.

Hansen, Ashley and the sheriff examine the hills along with the mayor of Camp Verde, who orders the sheriff to spray the hills and the surrounding countryside with pesticide. Ashley protests that pesticide caused the problem to begin with and that the town would be better off using birds and rats (tarantulas' natural enemies) to eradicate them. The mayor dismisses the idea, fearing that having a large number of spiders and rats would scare away patrons of the county fair. A crop duster is enlisted to spray the pesticide; but once airborne, the pilot is attacked by tarantulas, causing the plane to crash before he can disperse the spray.

The spiders begin assaulting local residents, killing Birch and Hansen's sister-in-law, Terri. Hansen arrives at their home and rescues Terri's daughter, Linda. Hansen, Ashley and Linda take refuge in the Washburn Lodge and consult with the sheriff, who tells them the spiders are everywhere and Camp Verde is cut off. Officer Smith drives into town, while Hansen and the other survivors at the lodge plan to load up an RV and escape. However, the spiders have them trapped in the lodge, and they barricade themselves inside. Smith arrives at Camp Verde and finds the town under siege by the spiders. He is killed when another car crashes into a support post under the town's water tower, causing it to fall on his vehicle.

At the lodge, the power goes out, and Hansen is forced to venture into the lodge's basement to change a blown fuse. He succeeds, but is besieged by spiders who break through one of the basement windows, and just barely makes it back upstairs. The next day, the survivors rig up a radio receiver and listen for news of the attacks. To their surprise, the radio broadcast does not mention the attack; the outside world is oblivious to what happened. Hansen pries off the boards from one of the lodge's windows, and discovers the building, along with the entire town of Camp Verde, encased in spider silk cocoons.

Cast
 William Shatner as Rack Hansen
 Natasha Ryan as Linda Hansen
 Marcy Lafferty as Terry Hansen  
 Tiffany Bolling as Diane Ashley 
 Woody Strode as Walter Colby
 Altovise Davis as Birch Colby  
 Lieux Dressler as Emma Washburn 
 David McLean as Gene Smith 
 Joe Ross as Vern Johnson 
 Adele Malis-Morey as Betty Johnson 
 Roy Engel as Mayor Connors

Production 

Kantor told Fangoria magazine in 1998 that the film did indeed use 5,000 of the large, hairy spiders, though a number of rubber model spiders were also used during production. The live tarantulas were procured by offering Mexican spider wranglers US$10 for each live tarantula they could find; this meant that $50,000 of the film's $500,000 budget went towards the purchase of spiders.

The large number of tarantulas kept on hand led to some unusual production difficulties. Not only did each spider have to be kept warm, but because of the creatures' cannibalistic tendencies, all 5,000 spiders had to be kept in separate containers. Additionally, tarantulas are usually shy around people, so fans and air tubes often had to be used to get the spiders to move toward their "victims". Indeed, in a number of the scenes where the tarantulas are "attacking" people, it is obvious to the viewer that the spiders are merely moving around, usually away from their intended victims.

Contrary to popular belief, the venom of most tarantulas is not dangerous to humans, causing no more harm than a bee sting (unless the person is allergic to the venom). The worst injury most of the actors suffered was troublesome itching caused by the spiders shedding their bristles (Tarantula urticating bristles have been used to make itching powder sold in joke and novelty stores).

Sequel 

Rumors have occasionally surfaced that a sequel to Kingdom of the Spiders was in production; however, no such film has yet been made. Shatner told Fangoria in 1998 that he was working with Cannon Films in the late 1980s to produce a sequel, titled simply Kingdom of the Spiders 2. The actor claimed that he supplied the film's premise, which would have featured a man being tortured by his enemies, preying upon his intense fear of spiders, to get him to reveal a secret. Cannon went so far as to take out a full-page advertisement in Variety magazine announcing that Shatner would direct and star in the film, but the studio went bankrupt before production could begin.

In 2003, the website for Port Hollywood, a film production company run by Kantor and Howard James Reekie, posted a brief synopsis of the plot of another proposed sequel, to be titled Kingdom of the Spiders II, suggesting that the villainous spiders would this time be driven to attack humans due to secret government experiments involving extremely low frequency (or ELF). The synopsis also details Native American imagery that would factor into the plot.

Legacy 
Kantor hinted in his Fangoria interview that Arachnophobia, which Steven Spielberg produced, bears several similarities to Kingdom of the Spiders. "I thought it was a copy", Kantor stated, "but you don't go and sue Spielberg!"

In popular culture
Rifftrax made the movie an object of ridicule in an April 23, 2013, video on demand download, which featured the movie with a running mocking commentary by Mystery Science Theater 3000 alumni Michael J. Nelson, Kevin Murphy and Bill Corbett.

Home media
Shout! Factory released Kingdom of The Spiders: Special Edition on DVD in early 2010.

References

External links
 
 
 
 Behind-the-scenes production photos Collection of Stephen Lodge.

1977 films
1977 horror films
1970s monster movies
American monster movies
American natural horror films
American science fiction horror films
Films about spiders
Films directed by John Cardos
Films set in Arizona
Dimension Pictures films
1970s English-language films
1970s American films